Winamac is a town in Monroe Township, Pulaski County, in the U.S. state of Indiana. The population was 2,490 at the 2010 census. It is the county seat of Pulaski County.

History
The town's name came from the Potawatomi word for "catfish." It was selected as the county seat in 1839. Winamac was incorporated as a town in 1868.

The Winamac post office has been in operation since 1839.

Pulaski County Courthouse, Dr. George W. Thompson House, and Vurpillat's Opera House are listed on the National Register of Historic Places.

Geography
Winamac is located at  (41.0525, -86.6044).

Demographics

2010 census
As of the census of 2010, there were 2,490 people, 1,028 households, and 617 families living in the town. The racial makeup of the town was 97.2% White, 0.5% African American, 0.3% Native American, 0.4% Asian, 0.3% from other races, and 1.2% from two or more races. Hispanic or Latino of any race were 2.3% of the population.

There were 1,028 households, of which 31.3% had children under the age of 18 living with them, 41.8% were married couples living together, 13.1% had a female householder with no husband present, 5.1% had a male householder with no wife present, and 40.0% were non-families. 36.1% of all households were made up of individuals, and 17.3% had someone living alone who was 65 years of age or older. The average household size was 2.29 and the average family size was 2.97.

The median age in the town was 38.8 years. 23.7% of residents were under the age of 18; 9% were between the ages of 18 and 24; 25.2% were from 25 to 44; 25.6% were from 45 to 64; and 16.3% were 65 years of age or older. The gender makeup of the town was 48.8% male and 51.2% female.

2000 census
As of the census of 2000, there were 2,418 people, 988 households, and 607 families living in the town. The racial makeup of the town was 97.39% White, 0.70% African American, 0.21% Native American, 0.12% Asian, 0.04% Pacific Islander, 0.17% from other races, and 1.36% from two or more races. Hispanic or Latino of any race were 1.28% of the population.

There were 988 households, out of which 29.5% had children under the age of 18 living with them, 46.8% were married couples living together, 10.9% had a female householder with no husband present, and 38.5% were non-families. 34.9% of all households were made up of individuals, and 19.1% had someone living alone who was 65 years of age or older. The average household size was 2.27 and the average family size was 2.93.

In the town, the population was spread out, with 23.6% under the age of 18, 8.9% from 18 to 24, 26.1% from 25 to 44, 19.6% from 45 to 64, and 21.7% who were 65 years of age or older. The median age was 38 years. For every 100 females, there were 86.4 males. For every 100 females age 18 and over, there were 83.1 males.

The median income for a household in the town was $31,413, and the median income for a family was $43,824. Males had a median income of $29,667 versus $22,461 for females. The per capita income for the town was $16,447. About 5.3% of families and 8.2% of the population were below the poverty line, including 11.9% of those under age 18 and 11.7% of those age 65 or over.

Education
The town has a lending library, the Pulaski County Public Library.

Economy
BraunAbility is based in Winamac.

Notable people

Justin Haley, NASCAR driver
Ralph Braun, businessman
John Buchanan, biochemist
Mitchell Royer, Managing partner of Craftsmen Events in Austin, Texas, Broke the Guinness World Record for Largest Gathering of People Dressed as Rabbits, March 30, 2018
David E. Lilienthal, lawyer and head of Tennessee Valley Authority and Atomic Energy Commission
Judith A. Myers, Illinois state senator and educator
Carl W. Riddick, member of the U.S. House of Representatives from Montana, editor of the Winamac Republican newspaper

References

External links
 
 Town of Winamac, Indiana website
 ePodunk: Profile for Winamac, Indiana, IN
 City-Data.com

Towns in Pulaski County, Indiana
Towns in Indiana
County seats in Indiana